A Book from the Sky is the title of a book produced by Chinese artist Xu Bing in the style of fine editions from the Song and Ming dynasties, but filled entirely with meaningless glyphs designed to resemble traditional Chinese characters. The book, which consists of four volumes totaling 604 pages, was printed in a single print run of 126 copies between 1987 and 1991, and was first publicly exhibited in October 1988, in Beijing's China Art Gallery.

The work was originally titled Mirror to Analyze the World: The Century’s Final Volume, a title which "evokes the trope of the book as jian 鍳 or mirror in the venerable tradition of imperial historiography". However, the artist eventually felt that this title was "cumbersome" and "heavily influenced by Western forms and the current cultural climate", and decided to adopt the name that was already in popular use, Tianshu. In Chinese, the term tian shu (“divine writing”) originally referred to certain kinds of religious texts, but is now used to mean "gibberish"; it has thus been suggested that nonsense writing would be a more appropriate translation of the title.

Production

The book is composed using a set of 4,000 characters, as this is roughly the number of characters in common usage in modern written Chinese. These characters were designed on the basis of the Kangxi radicals, so that "in terms of density of strokes and frequency of occurrence, they... appear, on the page, to be real characters". In addition to these, page and fascicle numbers were indicated using tally marks based on the Chinese character 正.

The characters were carved into individual pieces of movable type made from pear wood, in a style slightly squatter than that of Song typefaces. Initially, Xu himself typeset sample pages, and took them for printing to a factory in the village of Hanying, in Caiyu township. (This was one of the last remaining traditional printing factories in China, which after the Cultural Revolution mainly produced state-sponsored reprints of classical texts using pre-Revolution woodblocks.) Later, workers at the factory typeset the pages by referring to a "model book" prepared by Xu, which contained symbols such as ↓★○☒❖ that had been placed in a one-to-one correspondence with his 4,000 pseudo-Chinese characters.

Reactions

Critical reactions to A Book from the Sky were initially dismissive. In 1990, an article in a Beijing newspaper, said to have been authored by an agent of the Ministry of Culture, described it as “ghosts building walls”, i.e., obfuscation for the sake of obfuscation. Meanwhile, “New Wave” artists found it too “traditional and academic”. Nevertheless, the 1988 exhibition of the book at the China Art Gallery attracted a broad audience that included not only artists, but also professors and editors, some of whom visited the exhibition repeatedly in an attempt to find even a single real Chinese character. Later critics viewed the work more positively.

A Book from the Sky is considered to be a representative of the “1985 Fine Arts New Wave”, and has been interpreted as “a primary symbol of the broad liberalization movement that characterized the years prior to the Tiananmen massacre”. It has also invited comparisons with James Joyce’s Finnegans Wake, as “a radical challenge to how we think about language, writing, literacy, and human-machine relationship”. However, according to Xu, his main purpose was to “expose the fact that Chinese literary culture is 討厭 taoyan”: ‘boring’ or ‘tedious’. In later works such as Square Word Calligraphy and Book from the Ground, he takes this idea further by subverting the logographic nature of the Chinese script in ways that make it broadly accessible.

Notes

References

External links
Description on Xu Bing’s website
Blog post mentioning A Book from the Sky, with photographs

Art exhibitions in China
1988 books
Chinese characters
Artists' books